The Mitchell-Rountree House is located in Platteville, Wisconsin.

It is an early 1.5-story cottage built of carefully fit dolomite for Rev. Samuel Mitchell in a style from his native Virginia. Mitchell had served in the Revolutionary War. John Rountree, founder of Platteville, married Mitchell's daughter, probably built the house, and Rountrees lived there for many years.

History
Samuel Mitchell was an American Revolutionary War veteran who had retired to the area after serving as Methodist Episcopal clergy in Virginia and Illinois.  His son, Rev. John T. Mitchell, was appointed as the first pastor of the Platteville Methodist Episcopal Church in 1832. John H. Rountree was Mitchell's son-in-law. One of the founders of Platteville, he was a veteran of the Black Hawk War and served in the Wisconsin State Senate and the Wisconsin State Assembly. The house currently serves as a museum. It was listed on the National Register of Historic Places in 1972 and on the State Register of Historic Places in 1989.

The J. H. Rountree Mansion, a personal residence that Rountree later built for himself and his family, is also located in Platteville and listed on the National Register.

References

External links

Houses on the National Register of Historic Places in Wisconsin
National Register of Historic Places in Grant County, Wisconsin
Houses in Grant County, Wisconsin
Historic house museums in Wisconsin
Museums in Grant County, Wisconsin
Colonial architecture in the United States
Limestone buildings in the United States
Houses completed in 1837